Canada–Sweden relations are the interstate relations between Canada and the Kingdom of Sweden. They are founding members of the Arctic Council and have positive cultural and economic relations. In addition, there are more than 300,000 Canadians of Swedish descent. The relationship is backed with many mutual treaties, and sees moderate foreign direct investment and trade. One notable commonality for both Canada and Sweden are their commitments to feminist foreign policy.

History and Notable Events 
Canadian diplomatic relations with Sweden were initiated by Canada in 1944, with a Canadian legation appointed in 1947. In 1949, an envoy was established, which was raised to status as ambassador status in 1956.

One driver of positive relations are a 330,000 person population in Canada of Swedish descent, especially in the Canadian prairie provinces, Yukon territory and British Columbia.

Shared Organizational Membership 
Both developed Western countries, Sweden and Canada have significant overlap in organizational membership. Both are full members of the Arctic Council. Both have ratified membership and were founding members of the OECD. Canada and Sweden shared non-permanent seats on the United Nations Security Council in 1958.

Economic Relations 
Significant trade relations exist between the two countries. Canada imported $2 billion dollars of Swedish goods in 2020, and exported $0.4 billion, both slightly down from recent years. Foreign direct investment from Sweden into Canada was $2.3 billion in 2020 and Canadian investment in Sweden the same year was $7.6 billion. Major Swedish exports to Canada include chemical products, machinery and electronic equipment, while Canadian exports to Sweden are driven by mineral products, and machinery and electronics,

Swedish suppliers have recently been a subject of interest in the Canadian national security context. Through the early 2020s, Canada is considering whether to permit Chinese technology company Huawei to provide 5G cellular services in Canada. Swedish company Ericsson is often posited as the main alternative technology provider in the case of a ban, and was selected by all three major Canadian telecom companies as their technology provider. After a cancellation of a single-bid contract made by a former Prime Minister, Canadian Prime Minister Justin Trudeau launched a new procurement process. In the bid to replace Canada's CF-18 fleet, Swedish aerospace company Saab's Gripen fighter was one of three long-listed fighters for replacement, and remains one of two fighters under final consideration, alongside American aerospace conglomerate Lockheed Martin's F-35 Lightning II.

Diplomatic Relations 
Canada—Sweden relations could be characterized as warm based on frequent joint statements and bilateral meetings of a co-operative nature. In 2006, the Canadian Prime Minister, Stephen Harper received King Carl XVI Gustaf and Queen Silvia of Sweden in Ottawa, Canada's capital. In 2021, Canadian minister of International Trade, the Honourable Mary Ng had a meeting with Swedish minister of Foreign Trade, Anna Hallberg. 

Canada has an embassy in Stockholm and honorary consulates in Göteborg and Malmö. Sweden has an embassy in Ottawa and honorary consulates in Calgary, Edmonton, Fredericton, Halifax, Montreal, Quebec City, Regina, Toronto, Vancouver and Winnipeg. 

Canadians and Swedes were both affected by the Iranian downing of Flight PS752, and joined together with the United Kingdom and Ukraine in a joint statement calling on the Iranian government to allow access to international investigators after initial findings by Iranian officials were inconclusive as to the cause of the crash. 

Canada and Sweden share a tax treaty and an extradition treaty, among 39 others, including social security, visas, air services and commercial matters. Canada's trade relationship with Sweden is predominantly governed by the Comprehensive Economic and Trade Agreement. 

On a municipal level, at least two Canadian and Swedish cities are twinned. The Swedish city of Leksand is paired with the Canadian city of Aurora, Ontario, and the Canadian city of Saskatoon is paired with the Swedish city of Umeå.

Cultural and Other Relationships 

Both countries have interdisciplinary research programs studying each other's cultural groups. Canada has Scandinavian studies at at least four universities, with Swedish focuses at the University of Alberta, University of British Columbia, and University of Toronto. Sweden has Canadian studies courses available at Stockholm University.

Both countries are seen as having feminist foreign policy, with Sweden being the earliest adopter, and Canada following soon after, both countries bolstering feminist movements and programs geared to women abroad. Both countries have been criticized for arms sales to Saudi Arabia, whose government has non-feminist tendencies. Sweden cancelled a major arms deal with Saudi Arabia in 2016, but weapons have since been reported as being have used in the Yemeni Civil War (2014–present), in which the Saudi Arabian backed Cabinet of Yemen which have fought the Houthis alongside Saudi forces and air support

See also  
Foreign relations of Canada 
Foreign relations of Sweden
Swedish Canadian
Canada–European Union relations
Comprehensive Economic and Trade Agreement
Sweden–NATO relations

References 

 
Sweden
Bilateral relations of Sweden